Henri Elby may refer to:

 Henri Elby (1894–1974), French politician
 Henri Elby (1918–1986), French politician